Edwin Charles Hanbury (23 June 1848 – 29 September 1914) was an English cricketer. Hanbury was a right-handed batsman. He was born at Clapham, Surrey.

Hanbury made his first-class debut for Surrey in 1871 against Kent at The Oval. He made two further first-class appearances in that season, against Gloucestershire at Clifton College Close Ground, and Sussex at The Oval. He scored a total of 44 runs in his three appearances, at an average of 11.00, with a high score of 17.

He died at Ramsgate, Kent on 29 September 1914.

References

External links
Edwin Hanbury at ESPNcricinfo
Edwin Hanbury at CricketArchive

1848 births
1914 deaths
People from Clapham
English cricketers
Surrey cricketers